Arre is a comune (municipality) in the Province of Padua in the Italian region Veneto, located about  southwest of Venice and about  south of Padua.

Arre borders the following municipalities: Agna, Bagnoli di Sopra, Candiana, Conselve, Terrassa Padovana.

Demographic evolution

Twin towns
Arre is twinned with:

  Warmeriville, France

References

Cities and towns in Veneto
Articles which contain graphical timelines